Fletcher Bell (July 26, 1929 – February 18, 2000) was an American politician who served as the Kansas Insurance Commissioner from 1971 to 1991.

References

1929 births
2000 deaths
Kansas Insurance Commissioners
Kansas Republicans